Gymnoscelis merochyta is a moth in the family Geometridae. It is found on Peninsular Malaysia and Borneo.

Adults have pale hindwings and brown forewings with pale areas across the dorsum and basally.

References

Moths described in 1932
Gymnoscelis